Maradi Airport  is an airport serving Maradi, Niger. The airport is on the east side of the city.

The Maradi non-directional beacon (Ident: MY) is located on the field.

Airlines and destinations

See also
Transport in Niger
List of airports in Niger

References

External links
 OurAirports - Niger
 OpenStreetMap - Maradi
   Great Circle Mapper - Maradi
 Maradi Airport
 Google Earth

Airports in Niger
Buildings and structures in Maradi, Niger